Tadija Dragićević (born 28 January 1986) is a retired Serbian professional basketball player.

Professional career
Dragićević grew up with the KK Crvena zvezda youth teams, and patiently improved himself as a player, until he eventually became a team captain and Adriatic League MVP at the senior level. On 22 January 2010, after five years in the club's first team, he was released from the club, due to financial difficulties that the club had fallen into. 

On 25 January 2010 he signed with the Italian club Lottomatica Roma, for the rest of the season. He spent the following season playing with Alba Berlin, in the Basketball Bundesliga. In July 2011, he signed a two-year contract with the Italian club Angelico Biella. In 30 games played in the Italian League, he averaged 10.6 points and 6.4 rebounds per game. 

In July 2012, he signed a one-year deal with the Ukrainian club Azovmash. In October 2013, he signed a two-month deal with the Turkish team Anadolu Efes. Later that same season, he didn't extend his contract with the team, so he was released. On 3 January 2014 he returned to his former club, Crvena zvezda, signing a contract with them for the rest of the season. 

On 15 September 2014 Dragićević signed a one-year deal with the French team Strasbourg IG. On 24 September 2015 he signed with the Montenegrin team Budućnost Podgorica.

On 12 October 2016 Dragićević signed with the Greek club Aris Thessaloniki for the rest of the 2016–17 season. 

On 7 January 2018 Dragićević signed with Turkish club Yeşilgiresun Belediye. On 29 December 2018 he signed with Spanish club Cafés Candelas Breogán.

NBA draft rights
Dragićević was drafted 53rd overall in the 2008 NBA draft, by the Utah Jazz. His draft rights were traded in June 2012 to the Dallas Mavericks. On 14 July 2014 Dragićević's rights were traded to the Chicago Bulls, in exchange for Greg Smith. On 22 January 2019 Dragićević's rights were traded to the Houston Rockets, in exchange for Carmelo Anthony, the rights to Jon Diebler and cash considerations. On 27 November 2020 Dragićević's draft rights were traded to the New York Knicks.

EuroLeague career statistics

|-
| style="text-align:left;"| 2013–14
| style="text-align:left;"| Anadolu Efes
| 10 || 2 || 15.4 || .426 || .370 || .857 || 1.9 || .6 || .4 || .2 || 6.2 || 6.3
|- class="sortbottom"
| style="text-align:left;"| Career
| style="text-align:left;"|
| 10 || 2 || 15.4 || .426 || .370 || .857 || 1.9 || .6 || .4 || .2 || 6.2 || 6.3

Personal life
He is a twin brother of Strahinja Dragićević who is also a professional basketball player.
He is also father of two sons Andrej and Maksim.

See also 
 List of NBA drafted players from Serbia
 Utah Jazz draft history

References

External links
 FIBA Profile
 Euroleague.net Profile
 Champions League Profile
 Eurobasket.com Profile
 Adriatic League Profile
 Italian League Profile 
 Greek League Profile

1986 births
Living people
ABA League players
Alba Berlin players
Anadolu Efes S.K. players
Aris B.C. players
Basketball League of Serbia players
Basketball players from Čačak
BC Azovmash players
CB Breogán players
KK Budućnost players
KK Crvena zvezda players
KK Mega Basket players
Lega Basket Serie A players
Liga ACB players
Pallacanestro Biella players
Pallacanestro Virtus Roma players
Power forwards (basketball)
Serbian expatriate basketball people in France
Serbian expatriate basketball people in Germany
Serbian expatriate basketball people in Greece
Serbian expatriate basketball people in Italy
Serbian expatriate basketball people in Montenegro
Serbian expatriate basketball people in Spain
Serbian expatriate basketball people in Turkey
Serbian expatriate basketball people in Ukraine
Serbian men's basketball players
SIG Basket players
Utah Jazz draft picks
Yeşilgiresun Belediye players
Twin sportspeople
Serbian twins